"Don't You Know How Much I Love You" is a song written by Michael Stewart and Dan Williams, and recorded by American country music artist Ronnie Milsap.  It was released in July 1983 as the second single from the album Keyed Up.  The song was Milsap's twenty-third number one country hit.  The single went to number one for one week and spent a total of twelve weeks on the country chart.

Charts

Weekly charts

Year-end charts

References

1983 singles
1983 songs
Ronnie Milsap songs
Song recordings produced by Tom Collins (record producer)
RCA Records singles